The European Tour 2013/2014 – Event 1 (also known as the 2013 Victoria Bulgarian Open) was a professional minor-ranking snooker tournament that took place between 6–9 June 2013 at the Universiada Hall in Sofia, Bulgaria.

Judd Trump was the defending champion, but he lost 2–4 against David Gilbert in the last 64.

John Higgins won his 41st professional title by defeating Neil Robertson 4–1 in the final. Ronnie O'Sullivan played in his first tournament outside of England since 2012 China Open, and he reached the semi-finals, where he lost to Higgins.

Prize fund and ranking points
The breakdown of prize money and ranking points of the event is shown below:

1 Only professional players can earn ranking points.

Main draw

Preliminary round
Best of 7 frames

Main rounds

Top half

Section 1

Section 2

Section 3

Section 4

Bottom half

Section 5

Section 6

Section 7

Section 8

Finals

Century breaks

 142, 131, 115, 111, 106, 105, 105  Neil Robertson
 142, 126, 101, 100  Anthony McGill
 136  David Gilbert
 134  Matthew Stevens
 133, 102  Mark Williams
 130, 107  Robert Milkins
 129  Stuart Carrington
 126, 111, 105, 100  Ronnie O'Sullivan
 124  David Grace
 123, 123, 115  Barry Hawkins
 121  Judd Trump
 120  Mark King
 119  Jamie Jones
 118, 112, 102, 100  John Higgins

 112, 110  Anthony Hamilton
 112  Scott Donaldson
 112  Jack Lisowski
 112  Dominic Dale
 108  Kurt Maflin
 105, 100  Jimmy Robertson
 105  Alfie Burden
 105  Paul Davison
 104  Graeme Dott
 104  Daniel Wells
 102  Fraser Patrick
 102  Joel Walker
 101  Shaun Murphy

References

External links
 

2013
ET1
2013 in Bulgarian sport